Highway 349 (AR 349, Ark. 349, and Hwy. 349) is a designation for two state highways in Northeast Arkansas. One route of  begins at Highway 226 and runs north to Highway 18/Highway 91. A second route of  begins at Highway 230 and runs north to Highway 228. Both routes are maintained by the Arkansas Department of Transportation (ArDOT).

Route description

Craighead County
Highway 349 is a short connecting highway west of Jonesboro on Crowley's Ridge in Northeast Arkansas. Beginning at Highway 226, a four-lane divided road serving mostly Jonesboro-bound traffic, the highway runs east to a junction with Highway 226 Spur (AR 226S), when Highway 349 turns north along the Union Pacific Railway railroad tracks for approximately 1 mile (1.6 km). Passing through a residential area on the outskirts of Jonesboro, the route ends at a junction with Highway 18/Highway 91 at the campus of Westside Consolidated School District near Herman.

Lawrence County
Highway 349 begins at Highway 230 in southeastern Lawrence County. An rural connector route, the highway runs north and west to Highway 228 south of Sedgwick, where it terminates.

History
Some three-digit highways in Northeast Arkansas are former alignments of US Highways, with the second two digits representing the former designation, such as Highway 267 and Highway 367 representing former alignments of U.S. Route 67 (US 67). Although Highway 349 has proximity to US 49, the first segment was designated in November 1966, prior to US 49 entering the area in 1978. The Lawrence County segment was created following the Arkansas General Assembly passing Act 9 of 1973.

In 1977, the southern terminus was extended to Highway 39 (which would be redesignated as US 49 the following year) at Gibson. In 1979, this mileage was removed from the state highway system in a deal between the Craighead County Judge and the AHTD. This changed the southern terminus from US 49 back to Highway 226.

Major intersections

See also

References

External links

349
Transportation in Craighead County, Arkansas
Transportation in Lawrence County, Arkansas
1966 establishments in Arkansas